Akers-Jones is a surname. Notable people with the surname include:

David Akers-Jones (1927-2019), British colonial administrator in Hong Kong, husband of Jane
Jane Akers-Jones (1928-2002), British Girl Guide leader in Hong Kong, wife of David

Compound surnames